Anshan railway station is a railway station located in Anshan, Liaoning, China, on the Shenyang-Dalian and Harbin–Dalian lines, which are operated by China Railway.

History
The Anshan railway station opened in 1918 and was initially called Anshan Yi.

References

Railway stations in Liaoning
Railway stations in China opened in 1918
Stations on the Shenyang–Dalian Railway